Evert Brynolf Jakobsson (16 February 1886 – 16 July 1960) was a Finnish javelin thrower who competed at the 1908 Summer Olympics.

Athletics 

Evert Jakobsson with his brother Jarl emerged as javelin specialists in the summer of 1906. Their success was based on an alteration on the grip of the javelin. They had stapled two bits of stiff cord on it, improving its support for fingers. The existing world record by Eric Lemming was 53.90 metres, but with their enhancement, Evert broke it with 57.42. He travelled to Stockholm in September 1906 to challenge Lemming. Although Lemming was victorious, he duplicated their grip and took back the record with 58.37 metres. At this point, the new grip was banned and all results achieved with it were disqualified, reverting the world record to 53.90.

Other 

His parents were master builder Gustaf Jakobsson and Josefina Torck. He married Elsa Alma Elisabet Savander (born 1894) in 1916. They had three children:
 Jack Witikka, born 1916, film director
 Inga Elsa, 1918
 Kerstin, 1920
His brother Jarl was another 1908 Olympian. Figure skater Walter Jakobsson, who won Olympic gold in 1920 pair skating, was his cousin.

He was in the municipal council of Haaga in 1914–1930.

He held the rank vääpeli in the White Guard.

He received the following medals:
 Commemorative medal of the Liberation War
 Medal of Liberty, 1st Class
 Civil Guard Medal of Merit
 Commemorative Medal of the Winter War
 First Class Knight of the White Rose of Finland
 Cross of Merit of the Fire Defence

References

1886 births
1960 deaths
Athletes from Helsinki
Finnish male javelin throwers
Olympic athletes of Finland
Athletes (track and field) at the 1908 Summer Olympics